Jarosław Zarębski (born 26 January 1979) is a Polish former road cyclist. He notably competed in the road race at the 2005 UCI Road World Championships and in the 2003 Giro di Lombardia.

Major results

2002
 3rd Road race, National Road Championships
2004
 5th Puchar Uzdrowisk Karpackich
 6th Overall Szlakiem Grodów Piastowskich
1st Stage 2
 6th Overall Dookoła Mazowsza
 10th Wachovia Classic
2005
 1st Prologue Bałtyk–Karkonosze Tour
 5th Overall Szlakiem Grodów Piastowskich
1st Points classification
1st Stage 4
 5th Road race, National Road Championships
 5th Puchar Ministra Obrony Narodowej
 8th Grand Prix de Denain
 10th Scheldeprijs
2006
 9th Memoriał Andrzeja Trochanowskiego
2007
 1st Stage 1 (ITT) Szlakiem Grodów Piastowskich
 9th Memoriał Andrzeja Trochanowskiego

References

External links 

1979 births
Living people
People from Wąbrzeźno
Polish male cyclists
Sportspeople from Kuyavian-Pomeranian Voivodeship